Mina River may refer to:
 Mina River (Indonesia)
 Mina River (Algeria)